Laurence Rochat (born 1 August 1979) is a Swiss cross-country skier who has competed since 1996. She won a bronze medal in the 4 × 5 km relay at the 2002 Winter Olympics in Salt Lake City and had her best individual finish with a 15th place in the Individual sprint at the 2006 Winter Olympics in Turin.

Rochat's best finish at the Nordic skiing World Championships was a 12th in the 30 km event in 2005. She also has nineteen victories at various levels in her career since 1998.

Cross-country skiing results
All results are sourced from the International Ski Federation (FIS).

Olympic Games
 1 medal – (1 bronze)

World Championships

a.  Cancelled due to extremely cold weather.

World Cup

Season standings

References

External links
  
 

1979 births
Living people
Swiss female cross-country skiers
Cross-country skiers at the 2002 Winter Olympics
Cross-country skiers at the 2006 Winter Olympics
Cross-country skiers at the 2010 Winter Olympics
Olympic bronze medalists for Switzerland
Olympic cross-country skiers of Switzerland
Olympic medalists in cross-country skiing
Medalists at the 2002 Winter Olympics
20th-century Swiss women